Gerald Lee may refer to:

 Gerald Bruce Lee (born 1952), judge on the United States District Court
 Gerald Lee (basketball) (born 1987), Finnish basketball player
 Gerald Stanley Lee (1862–1944), American Congregational clergyman and author

See also
Jerry Lee (disambiguation)